is a Japanese actor and model. In 2012, he debuted as an actor in The Kirishima Thing.

Career

He debuted as a model in the 19th Men's Non-no Exclusive Model Audition in high school. After graduating from high school, he aimed to become a jewelry designer and proceeded to attend a jewelry school. He was active as a model for ZUCCa or Yohji Yamamoto from 2006 to 2011.

He debuted in The Kirishima Thing in 2012 and has been an actor since then.

He has acted on the NHK TV program “Rakugo Deeper!"

Personal life
Higashide graduated from Saitama Prefectural Asaka High School. He practiced kendo daily when he was young because his father is a kendo teacher. His father is also a cook of Japanese cuisine.

He married Anne Watanabe on January 1, 2015. Their twin daughters were born in May 2016. Their son was born in November 2017.

In January 2020, Shūkan Bunshun revealed that Higashide had been having an extramarital affair with actress Erika Karata since 2017, when Watanabe was pregnant with their third child. The report was later confirmed by his agency. The incident has caused Higashide to lose several endorsement deals. On 1 August 2020, Watanabe finalized her divorce with Higashide, promising that they’ll work together to take care of the children.

Filmography

Film

Television
 Renai Kentei (NHK, 2012), Junya Yoshimitsu
 Reset: Honto no Shiawase no Mitsukekata (TBS-MBS, 2012), Shion/Jun Aya
 Wonderful Single Life (Fuji TV, 2012), Hiroki Yamada
 xxxHolic (Wowow, 2013) Shizuka Dōmeki
 Amachan (NHK, 2013), young Daikichi Ōmukai
 Gochisōsan (NHK, 2013-14), Yūtarō Nishikado
 Fathers, Episode 7 (TBS, 2014), Yūsuke Togawa
 Hana Moyu (NHK, 2015), Genzui Kusaka
 A Restaurant With Many Problems (Fuji TV, 2015), Chef Makoto Monji
 Moribito: Guardian of the Spirit (NHK, 2016), Tanda
 Death Note: New Generation (Hulu, 2016), Tsukuru Mishima
 Moribito: Guardian of the Spirit Season 2 (NHK, 2017), Tanda
 Leaders 2 (TBS, 2017), Makoto Kusakabe
 I love You Just a Little Bit (TBS, 2017), Ryōta Watanabe
 Yocho Sanpo Suru Shinryakusha (Wowow, 2017), Jiro Makabe
 Moribito: Guardian of the Spirit Season 3 (NHK, 2017-18), Tanda 
 The Confidence Man JP (Fuji TV, 2018), Boku-chan
 Villain: Perpetrator Chase Investigation (Wowow, 2019),  Shuichi Saeki
 Pure! ~ One-day idol director's case book ~ (NHK, 2019), Shusaku Todo
 Police and Prosecutor (TV Asahi, 2020), Shuhei Majima
 Wife of a Spy (NHK, 2020), Yasuharu Tsumori

Stage performances
Nocturnes (2015)
The Sea of Fertility (2018, 2018 PARCO PRODUCE)
The Second Summer (2019, M&Oplays Produce)

Dubbing
 Legend of the Demon Cat (2018), Bai Long (Liu Haoran)

Books

Magazines
Men's Non-no
FINEBOYS
GET ON!
smart
Smart HEAD
Soen

Awards and accolades

References

External links

1988 births
Japanese male film actors
Japanese male models
Japanese male stage actors
Japanese male television actors
Living people
Actors from Saitama Prefecture
Models from Saitama Prefecture
21st-century Japanese male actors